Tongass Passage is a strait on the Canada–United States border between Alaska and British Columbia, located on the southwest side of Wales Island.  Wales Island, and Pearse Island, to its northeast, were claimed by the United States prior to the settlement of the Alaska boundary dispute in 1903.  Prior to that time, numerous American-owned canneries lined its shores.  Canadian claims to the islands were affirmed in the Alaska Boundary Settlement of 1903, in which Tongass Passage, Pearse Canal and the Portland Canal were defined as comprising "Portland Channel", a term first used in the Anglo-Russian Treaty of 1825 as part of the marine boundary between Russian America and British claims in the region, but which remained undefined until the boundary settlement.

See also
Dixon Entrance
Portland Inlet
Fort Tongass
Tongass Island

References

Straits of Alaska
Straits of British Columbia
Straits of the Pacific Ocean
International straits
Canada–United States border
History of British Columbia
Pre-statehood history of Alaska
Bodies of water of Ketchikan Gateway Borough, Alaska
North Coast of British Columbia